Douglas A. Swift (born October 24, 1948) is a former American football linebacker who played six seasons in the National Football League for the Miami Dolphins. Swift moved into the starting lineup as a rookie and held the strongside linebacker position for the next six seasons, including the Dolphins' Super Bowl victories following the 1972 and 1973 seasons. Swift's blitz late in the second quarter of Super Bowl VII forced Washington Redskins quarterback Billy Kilmer to make a hurried throw, which Nick Buoniconti intercepted and returned into Washington territory to set up the Dolphins' second touchdown in a 14–7 victory, cementing Miami's 17–0 season. Made available in the 1976 NFL Expansion Draft, he chose to retire from football and enter medical school rather than report to the expansion Tampa Bay Buccaneers.

He is a graduate of both Nottingham High School and Amherst College (1970).  Swift is an anesthesiologist in Philadelphia.

References

1948 births
Living people
American football linebackers
Amherst Mammoths football players
Miami Dolphins players
Nottingham High School (Syracuse, New York) alumni
Players of American football from Syracuse, New York